Adolf Alexander Dillens, a Belgian genre-painter, was born at Ghent in 1821, and received instruction from his elder brother Hendrik Dillens. His first works were of an historical nature, but he afterwards devoted himself to pictures illustrating Zealand peasant life. He died in 1877. Amongst his best works are:

The Gossip at the Window.
Taking Toll at the Bridge (of this picture he painted three versions).
Asking in Marriage.
A Fair at Westcapelle (at Paris International Exhibition, 1855).
A Ball at Goes (at the same)
The Juggler (at London International Exhibition, 1862).
Skaters (in Brussels Museum).
Recruiting: Austrian Soldiers halting at a Tavern (in the same).

References

 

Belgian genre painters
1821 births
1877 deaths
Artists from Ghent
19th-century Belgian painters
19th-century Belgian male artists